Elections were held in the Australian state of Queensland on 1 June 1963 to elect the 78 members of the state's Legislative Assembly.

The major parties contesting the election were the Country Party led by Premier Frank Nicklin, the Liberal Party led by Alan Munro, the Labor Party led by Jack Duggan and the Queensland Labor Party led by Paul Hilton. The Country and Liberal parties governed in coalition.

This election marked the return of preferential voting after first past the post voting had been used for elections from 1944 to 1960.

The Country-Liberal coalition won a third term in office at the election.

Key dates

Results

|}

 839,323 electors were enrolled to vote at the election, but the Labor-held seat of Burke was not contested.

Seats changing party representation

This table lists changes in party representation at the 1963 election.

See also
 Members of the Queensland Legislative Assembly, 1960–1963
 Members of the Queensland Legislative Assembly, 1963–1966
 Candidates of the Queensland state election, 1963
 Nicklin Ministry

References

Elections in Queensland
1963 elections in Australia
1960s in Queensland
June 1963 events in Australia